The Free Way to the Catalan Republic, or Free Way, was a large gathering in Barcelona on 11 September 2015, the National Day of Catalonia, in support of Catalan independence. It was organized by "Now is the Time", a joint campaign organized and funded by the Assemblea Nacional Catalana (ANC) and Òmnium Cultural. The number of participants was estimated at about 1.8 million according to Barcelona's Municipal Police.

The demonstration followed similar protests in 2010, 2012, the Catalan Way (2013) and the Catalan Way 2014. It was followed by Go ahead, Catalan Republic (2016).

See also
 Catalan independence
 National Day of Catalonia

References

External links 

 Free Way to the Catalan Republic 
 Ara és l'hora (Now is the time)  

2015 in Catalonia
2015 protests
Catalan independence movement
Politics of Catalonia
Protests in Catalonia